Gliese 282 is a star system composed of four stars in the equatorial constellation of Monoceros. At a distance of 36 light years, this star has an apparent magnitude of 7.26 when viewed from Earth. It is not visible to the naked eye.

The Gl 282AB star system is composed of two K- type main-sequence stars. The primary component, Gliese 282A, is a BY Draconis type variable star with a stellar classification of K2V. It has an effective temperature of 4,956 K. The companion, Gliese 282B, is a smaller, class K5V star. As of 2003, the pair had an angular separation of 58.30 arc seconds along a position angle of 113°. This is equivalent to a projected physical separation of 824 AU.

There is a distant common proper motion companion (G 112-29) at an angular separation of 1.09°. At the estimated distance of Gl 282AB, this corresponds to a projected separation of 55,733 AU, making it one of the widest known physical companions. Initially believed to be a red dwarf star with a stellar classification of M1.5Ve, it turned out to be a pair of red dwarfs (Ca and Cb) with masses 0.55 and 0.19, orbiting each other on 6591 days orbit.

References

External links

4
0282
K-type main-sequence stars
Gliese, 0282
Monoceros (constellation)
037349
061606
BD−03 2001
Monocerotis, V869
J07395932-0335506